Neuropeptide VF precursor, also known as pro-FMRFamide-related neuropeptide VF or RFamide-related peptide precursor, is a propeptide that in mammals is encoded by the NPVF (or RPFP) gene. The NPVF gene, and thus the propeptide, are expressed in neurons in the mediobasal hypothalamus. The propeptide is cleaved to form three other peptides, which are:

 Neuropeptide SF (NPSF) (RFRP-1) – agonist of the NPFF1 and NPFF2 receptors (EC50 = 29 nM and 0.0011 nM, respectively)
 RFRP-2 – does not bind to either of the NPFF receptors; no known biological activity
 Neuropeptide VF (NPVF) (RFRP-3) – agonist of the NPFF1 receptor (IC50 = 0.7 nM)

NPSF and NPVF, originally referred to as the RFamide-related peptides RFRP-1 and RFRP-3, respectively, are the mammalian homologs of the avian neuropeptide gonadotropin-inhibitory hormone (GnIH). The mammalian NPVF and avian GnIH genes, along with their aforementioned peptide products, were discovered concurrently in 2000. Similarly to the avian GnIH neuropeptide, NPSF and NPVF have been found to potently inhibit gonadotropin secretion. Moreover, a potent and selective antagonist of the NPFF receptors, RF9, has been reported to possess "very strong" gonadotropin-releasing effects in vivo in male and female mice.

See also
 Neuropeptide FF
 FMRFamide
 Gonadotropin-releasing hormone
 Gonadotropin-inhibitory hormone
 Gonadotropin release inhibitor
 Kisspeptin

References

Further reading
 

Animal reproductive system
Hormones of the hypothalamus-pituitary-gonad axis
Neuropeptides
Peptide hormones
Precursor proteins
Sex hormones